Opalchenie Peak is the peak rising to  at the south extremity of the ice-covered Vinson Plateau, Sentinel Range in the Ellsworth Mountains, Antarctica. It is of low topographic prominence, just , with parent summit Fukushima Peak. The feature has a partly ice-free summit and south slopes, where two parallel ridges descend steeply southwestwards with Donnellan Glacier flowing in between and Mount Slaughter rising on the more southerly ridge. The northerly ridge was climbed up to the summit plateau by American Robert Anderson in November 1992, and subsequently used to establish a new route to Mount Vinson in 2003. Opalchenie Peak overlooks Vinson Plateau on the north, Craddock Massif on the southeast and upper Nimitz Glacier area on the southwest.

The peak is named after the Bulgarian Volunteer Force in the 1877-1878 Russo-Turkish War and the Macedonian-Adrianople Volunteer Force in the 1912-1913 Balkan Wars, ‘opalchenie’ being the Bulgarian for ‘volunteer force’.

Location
USGS mapping in 1961, updated in 1988.

Maps
 Vinson Massif. Scale 1:250 000 topographic map.  Reston, Virginia: US Geological Survey, 1988
 D. Gildea and C. Rada. Vinson Massif and the Sentinel Range. Scale 1:50 000 topographic map. Omega Foundation, 2007
 Antarctic Digital Database (ADD). Scale 1:250000 topographic map of Antarctica. Scientific Committee on Antarctic Research (SCAR). Since 1993, regularly updated

See also
 Mountains in Antarctica
 Four-thousander

Gallery

Notes

References
 Opalchenie Peak SCAR Composite Antarctic Gazetteer
 Bulgarian Antarctic Gazetteer Antarctic Place-names Commission (in Bulgarian) 
 Basic data (in English)

External links
 Opalchenie Peak. Adjusted Copernix satellite image
 Opalchenie Peak on AADC website

Ellsworth Mountains
Mountains of Ellsworth Land
Four-thousanders of Antarctica
Bulgaria and the Antarctic